Robert Howard McCollum is an American voice actor, television host, and producer who provides voices for a number of English-language versions of Japanese anime at Funimation. Outside of voice acting, he was a host of WFAA-TV's Good Morning Texas in 2009, and has worked as a producer and contributor there. 
Some of his major roles include Baki in Baki the Grappler, Teen & Adult Goten in Dragon Ball Z and GT, Sensui in Yu Yu Hakusho, Shinya Kogami in Psycho-Pass, Jellal Fernandes in Fairy Tail, Reiner Braun in Attack on Titan, Yusuke Tozawa in Witchblade, Kazuma Yagami in Kaze no Stigma, Donquixote Doflamingo in One Piece, Stain in My Hero Academia, Julius Novachrono in Black Clover, and Justice in Edens Zero.

Filmography

Video games

Dubbing roles

Anime

Films

Live-action films

Video games

References

External links
 
 
 

1971 births
Living people
American male voice actors
21st-century American male actors
Trinity University (Texas) alumni
People from Bentonville, Arkansas